Far Side of the Moon is a Canadian drama film, directed by Robert Lepage and released in 2003. The film is based on Lepage's eponymous play, which premiered in 2000.

Set in the context of the USSR-United States Space Race of the 1960s, the film centres on two brothers, both played by Lepage, who are struggling to cope with the recent death by suicide of their mother (Anne-Marie Cadieux). Philippe, the older brother, is a doctoral student in astronomy who buries his feelings in his academic pursuits, while André, the younger brother, is a gay television weatherman who has always had a happier and easier path through life but finds himself struggling.

The film received four Genie Award nominations at the 24th Genie Awards in 2004: Best Picture (Bob Krupinski and Mario St-Laurent), Best Director (Lepage), Best Actor (Lepage) and Best Adapted Screenplay (Lepage). Lepage won the award for Best Adapted Screenplay.

The film was Canada's official nomination for the Academy Award for Best Foreign Language Film for the 77th Academy Awards.

Cast

References

External links

Far Side of the Moon 

2003 films
Canadian drama films
2000s French-language films
Films directed by Robert Lepage
2003 drama films
Films based on Canadian plays
Canadian LGBT-related films
2003 LGBT-related films
LGBT-related drama films
French-language Canadian films
2000s Canadian films